Freestyle skiing at the 2011 Asian Winter Games was held at Tabagan Sport and Recreation Complex in the Almaty region, Kazakhstan. The six events were scheduled for January 31– February 3, 2011.

Schedule

Medalists

Men

Women

Medal table

Participating nations
A total of 32 athletes from 5 nations competed in freestyle skiing at the 2011 Asian Winter Games:

References

External links
 Official website

 
Asian Winter Games
2011 Asian Winter Games events
2011